Veli-Matti Ahonen  is a Finnish former ski jumper.

References

Living people
Finnish male ski jumpers
Year of birth missing (living people)
Place of birth missing (living people)
20th-century Finnish people